Komerční banka Bratislava is a commercial bank operates in Slovakia. Its wholly owned subsidiary of Czech Komerční banka, a member of the Group Société Générale.

History
Komerční banka Bratislava (herein KB Bratislava) has been operating in Slovakia since 1995 as a bank with a universal banking licence.

KB Bratislava was founded as a natural step in the expansion of business and financial activities between the Czech Republic and Slovakia. For its prompt and highly competitive system of payments with the Czech Republic, KB Bratislava has acquired a firm position on the Slovak financial market. KB Bratislava conducts its business based on its banking licence and meets the criteria for all types of financial transactions, including capital market transactions (under the supervision of the Financial Market Authority).

Société Générale
The integration of Czech Komerční banka into the Société Générale Group in October 2001 made KB Bratislava, part of one of the largest financial groups in the world and third largest corporate and investment bank in the Eurozone. It employs 103,000 people worldwide, offers to 20 million clients worldwide.

 See also: Société Générale

Shareholders
Czech Komerční banka is the 100% shareholder of Komerční banka Bratislava. Shareholder structure of Czech Komerční banka from September 2006 is:

 Société Générale (60.35%)
 Investors Bank & Trust (6.04%)
 The Bank of New York (2.92%)

Source: official site of Komerční banka Bratislava

External links
 Komerční banka Bratislava official site

Banks of Slovakia
Banks established in 1995
Société Générale